The 2019 Malaysian motorcycle Grand Prix was the eighteenth round of the 2019 MotoGP season. It was held at the Sepang International Circuit in Sepang on 3 November 2019.
Álex Márquez won the Moto2 title after finishing in 2nd place behind his closest title rival Brad Binder. Despite taking his fourth win of the season and the second consecutive win after winning the previous round at Phillip Island seven days ago, Márquez' 2nd place-finish was enough to mathematically eliminate Binder's hopes of winning his second title overall in his career after previously winning the 2016 Moto3 World Championship due to an uncatchable margin of Márquez by 28 points over Binder with one race to go.

It was instead Márquez' second championship title overall after winning the 2014 Moto3 World Championship. This day also marked the second time in the history of the sport, that both Márquez brothers claimed championships in the same year in their respective classes with Marc Márquez previously winning his 6th premier class title and the 4th consecutive title in Buriram.

Classification

MotoGP

 Miguel Oliveira withdrew from the event after Friday practice due to shoulder injury suffered at the previous round in Australia.
Andrea Iannone was retroactively disqualified on 31 March 2020 as part of his suspension for a failed doping test after the Malaysian Grand Prix.

Moto2

Moto3

Championship standings after the race

MotoGP

Moto2

Moto3

Notes

References

External links

Malaysia
Motorcycle Grand Prix
Malaysian motorcycle Grand Prix
Malaysian motorcycle Grand Prix